Kat Germain is a Canadian actress and writer born in Toronto, Ontario. She graduated with a Bachelor of Arts (Theatre) from Acadia University, Wolfville, Nova Scotia. She also holds a Bachelor of Education degree from York University.

Filmography

 Mary (Short film, 2003)
 This Beautiful City (2007)
 Sixty Seconds of Regret (2009)
 Small Town Murder Songs (2010)
 Dirge (2012)
 The Determinist (2014)

References

External links

 Kat Germain official website

Canadian film actresses
Writers from Toronto
Living people
Actresses from Toronto
Acadia University alumni
York University alumni
Year of birth missing (living people)